Duvva is a village in West Godavari district of the Indian state of Andhra Pradesh. It is located in Tanuku mandal of Kovvur revenue division. The nearest railway station is Satyavada (STVA) located at a distance of 5.77 Km from Duvva.

Economy  

The economy of Duvva is largely based on agriculture & small manufacturing. Most of the surrounding area is fertile farm land. The main crops grown in Duvva are rice and bananas. This is due to the composition of the soil, which is too moist to grow plants such as potatoes, and topography, which prohibits the growing of vegetables such as Eggplants or Tomatoes.

Etymology 
It is believed that the sage, Durvasa had established the village and the village was formerly known with the name, Durvasapuram.

Demographics 

 Census of India, Duvva had a population of 13596. The total population constitute, 6771 males and 6825 females with a sex ratio of 108 females per 100 males. 1360 children are in the age group of 0–6 years, with sex ratio of 873. The average literacy rate stands at 52.22%.

References 

Villages in West Godavari district